Wing Commander Academy is a 1996 American animated television series produced by Universal Cartoon Studios, along with a team led by Larry Latham. The show was based on the Wing Commander franchise and loosely served as a prequel to Wing Commander. The show's aired from September 21 to December 21, 1996, on the USA Network's "USA Action Extreme Team" block.

Spacecraft featured in the series
The series featured many spacecraft introduced in the Wing Commander video games. The Scimitar and Broadsword were the primary fighters and bombers flown by the main characters, with the Dralthi and Grikath fulfilling those roles for the Kilrathi. As in Wing Commander I, the TCS Tiger's Claw was a Bengal class strike carrier. Individual episodes also featured cameo appearances from ships introduced in later games such as Wing Commander III's Arrow, Hellcat and Longbow and Wing Commander IV's Avenger. None of these ships are mentioned by name. A number of new capital ships were introduced by the series including the Achilles class destroyer and the Agan Ra Sivar class dreadnaught.

Episode list

Home media
In March 2012, Visual Entertainment released Wing Commander Academy - The Complete Series on DVD in Region 1 for the first time. The series became available on the Peacock streaming service in July 2020.

Crossover
The episode 8, "Recreation" is the final part of a 4-episode crossover with 3 other shows that aired as part of the US "Action Extreme Team" programming block:

Mortal Kombat: Defenders of the Realm (1996, US, animated): episode 9 "Resurrection" (Part 3)
 Savage Dragon (1995–1996, US, Canada, animated): episode 21 (208) "Endgame" (Part 2)
Street Fighter (1995–1997, US, Canada, animated): episode 22 (209) "The Warrior King" (Part 1)

This crossover event featured the Warrior King and the orb but the principal characters of the four series don't meet each other.

References

External links
Wing Commander CIC

Wing Commander Academy at the Big Cartoon DataBase
Wing Commander Academy TV episodes

1996 American television series debuts
1996 American television series endings
1990s American animated television series
Animated series based on video games
USA Network original programming
USA Action Extreme Team
Military science fiction
American children's animated science fiction television series
Academy
Television series by Universal Animation Studios
Television series set on fictional planets
American children's animated action television series
American children's animated space adventure television series